Molossus may refer to:

 Molossus (bat), genus of bats
 Molossus (dog), extinct breed of dog
 Molossus of Epirus, a Greek dog breed
 Molossus (poetry), type of metrical foot
 Molossus (son of Neoptolemus), in Greek mythology, the son of Neoptolemus and Andromache and ancestor of the Molossians
 Molossus, Athenian commander on Euboea ~ 350 BC
 Molossus,  music theme on the Batman Begins soundtrack

See also 

 Molasses